Leukoaraiosis is a particular abnormal change in appearance of white matter near the lateral ventricles. It is often seen in aged individuals, but sometimes in young adults. On MRI, leukoaraiosis changes appear as white matter hyperintensities (WMHs) in T2 FLAIR images. On CT scans, leukoaraiosis appears as hypodense periventricular white-matter lesions.

The term "leukoaraiosis" was coined in 1986 by Hachinski, Potter, and Merskey as a descriptive term for rarefaction ("araiosis") of the white matter, showing up as decreased density on CT and increased signal intensity on T2/FLAIR sequences (white matter hyperintensities) performed as part of MRI brain scans.

These white matter changes are also commonly referred to as periventricular white matter disease, or white matter hyperintensities (WMH), due to their bright white appearance on T2 MRI scans. Many patients can have leukoaraiosis without any associated clinical abnormality. However, underlying vascular mechanisms are suspected to be the cause of the imaging findings. Hypertension, smoking, diabetes, hyperhomocysteinemia, and heart diseases are all risk factors for leukoaraiosis.

Leukoaraiosis has been reported to be an initial stage of Binswanger's disease but this evolution does not always happen.

Causes

White matter hyperintensities can be caused by a variety of factors, including ischemia, micro-hemorrhages, gliosis, damage to small blood vessel walls, breaches of the barrier between the cerebrospinal fluid and the brain, or loss and deformation of the myelin sheath. Multiple small vessel infarcts in the subcortical white matter can cause the condition, often the result of chronic hypertension leading to lipohyalinosis of the small vessels. Patients may develop cognitive impairment and dementia.

Special cases
 Ischaemic leukoaraiosis has been defined as the leukoaraiosis present after a stroke.
 Diabetes-associated leukoaraiosis has been reported
 CuRRL syndrome: increased Cup: Disc Ratio, Retinal GanglionCell Complex thinning, Radial Peripapillary Capillary Network Density Reduction and Leukoaraiosis
 CADASIL is a hereditary cerebrovascular disorder associated with T2-hyperintense white matter lesions that have a greater extent and earlier age of onset than age-related leukoaraiosis.

See also
 Hyperintensities
 Binswanger's disease
 Demyelinating disease

References

Further reading
 
 
 

Cerebrum